Karafuto was a former Japanese prefecture in the southern part of Sakhalin island, from 1905 to 1945.

Islands
 Names in italics are the current Russian names.
The Karafuto Prefecture incorporated several smaller islands.
Karafuto Island 樺太島 Sakhalin
Kaiba Island 海馬島 Moneron Island
Kaihyō Island 海豹島 Tyuleniy Island
Nijōiwa Rock 二丈岩 Kamen Opasnosti Rocks

Mountains
Karafuto was a very mountainous area. Its highest mountain was Mount Shisuka.
Mount Shisuka 敷香岳 (1,375 km) Mount Vozvrasheniye
Mount Horoto 幌登岳 (1,259m) Mount Matorosovskaya
Mount Esutoru 恵須取岳 (1,135m) Mount Ugoli
Mount Kamabushi 釜伏岳 (1,087m) Mount Krasnova
Mount Suzuya 鈴谷岳 (1,045m) Mount Chekhova
Mount Furito 振戸岳 (1,035m) Mount Korzhevina
Mount Niitoi 新問岳 (1,034m) Mount Odinokaya
Mount Nodasamu 野田寒岳 (1,029m) Mount Spambergo
Mount Kitasōya 北宗谷岳 (1,009m)

Lakes
Lake Taraika 多来加湖 Lake Nevskoye
Lake Tonnai 富内湖 Lake Tunaicha
Lake Raichishi 来知志湖 Lake Ainskoye
Lake Tōbuchi 遠渕湖 Lake Busse
Lake Waai 和愛湖 Lake Bolishoe Vavaiskoye
Lake Chibesan 地邊讃湖 Lake Chibisanskoye
Lake Tōhoro 遠幌湖 Lake Russkoye
Lake Ondō 恩洞湖 Lake Izvenchiboye
Lake Hakuchō 白鳥湖 Lake Lebyazhiye
Lake Omudō 雄武洞沼 Lake Protochnoye
Lake Tōro 塔路沼 Lake Touro

Rivers
Horonai River 幌内川 Poronai River
Naibushi River 内渕川 Naiva River
Rūtaka River 留多加川 Lyutoga River
Rukutama River 留久玉川 Rukutama River
Susuya River 鈴谷川 Susuya River
Esutoru River 恵須取川 Uglegorka River
Raichisi River 来知志川 Sura River
Chinnai River 珍内川 Krasnogorka River
Kitanayoshi River 北名好川 Lesogorka River

Bays and gulfs
Aniwa Bay 亜庭湾 Aniva Bay
Gulf of Taraika (Gulf of Patience) 多来加湾 Gulf of Terpeniya

Capes and Peninsulas
Cape Nakashiretoko 中知床岬 Cape Aniva
Cape Nishinotoro 西能登呂岬 Cape Crillon
Cape Kitashiretoko 北知床岬 Cape Terpeniya

Straits
Sōya Strait 宗谷海峡 La Pérouse Strait
Mamiya Strait 間宮海峡 (Strait of Tartary) Strait of Nevelskoy

Important ports

Maoka 真岡 Kholmsk
Ōdomari 大泊 Korsakov

Climate
Owing to the influence of the raw, foggy Sea of Okhotsk, the climate is very cold. At Dui the average yearly temperature is only 0.5°C (January -15.9°; July 16.1°), 1.7° at Kushunkotan and 3.1° at Aniwa (January, -12.5°; July, 15.7°). At Mamiya near Dui the annual range is from 27° in July to -39° in January, while at Rūtaka in the interior the minimum is -45°C. The rainfall averages 570 mm. Thick clouds for the most part shut out the sun; while the cold current from the Sea of Okhotsk, aided by north-east winds, brings immense ice-floes to the east coast in summer.

During the winter, the Sea of Okhotsk turns to ice, rendering the northern coast impassable to marine traffic, and halting the lucrative fisheries there until the thaw.

References

Karafuto
Geography of Sakhalin Oblast